George Cholmondeley, 3rd Earl of Cholmondeley,  (2 January 1703 – 10 June 1770), styled as Viscount Malpas from 1725 to 1733, was a British Whig politician and nobleman who sat in the House of Commons from 1724 to 1733.

Life
Cholmondeley was the son of George Cholmondeley, 2nd Earl of Cholmondeley, and Elizabeth van Ruyterburgh (or Ruttenburg). He was elected to the House of Commons for East Looe in 1724, a seat he held until 1727, and then represented Windsor between 1727 and 1733, when he succeeded his father as third Earl of Cholmondeley and entered the House of Lords. He held office under his father-in-law Sir Robert Walpole as a Lord of the Admiralty from 1727 to 1729, as a Lord of the Treasury from 1735 to 1736 and as Chancellor of the Duchy of Lancaster from 1736 to 1743 (from 1742 to 1743 under the premiership of The Earl of Wilmington). From 1743 to 1744 he also served as Lord Privy Seal under Henry Pelham and was Joint Vice-Treasurer of Ireland between 1744 and 1757. In 1736 he was admitted to the Privy Council.

Horace Walpole (1717–1797) described him as "a vain and empty man, shoved up so high by his father-in-law, Sir Robert Walpole, and fallen into contempt and obscurity by his own extravagance and insufficiency."

Apart from his political career Lord Cholmondeley was also Lord Lieutenant of Cheshire and South Wales (less Denbighshire) from 1733 to 1760. He was promoted to colonel in 1745, major-general in 1755, and lieutenant-general in 1759. He was also involved in the charitable effort to create a home for foundlings in London, which was hoped would alleviate the problem of child abandonment. The home became known as the Foundling Hospital and Cholmondeley sat on its board as a founding Governor.

Private life
Lord Cholmondeley married Lady Mary Walpole, daughter of Prime Minister Robert Walpole, 1st Earl of Orford, in 1723. He died in June 1770, aged 67. His eldest son George Cholmondeley, Viscount Malpas, predeceased him and he was succeeded in his titles by his grandson George, who was created Marquess of Cholmondeley in 1815. His second son Robert (1727-1804) began his career as a lieutenant in the 3rd Foot Guards but resigned after the Battle of Lauffeld in July 1747 and became a minister.

The actress Maria Nossiter was the daughter of Lord Cholmondeley's "favourite" housekeeper. Maria was educated, had money and enjoyed a successful, but brief, career. It is supposed that she was his daughter.

References

|-

|-

|-

|-

|-

1703 births
1770 deaths
British Army lieutenant generals
British MPs 1722–1727
British MPs 1727–1734
Chancellors of the Duchy of Lancaster
Knights Companion of the Order of the Bath
Lord-Lieutenants of Anglesey
Lord-Lieutenants of Caernarvonshire
Lord-Lieutenants of Cheshire
Lord-Lieutenants of Flintshire
Lord-Lieutenants of Merionethshire
Lord-Lieutenants of Montgomeryshire
Malpas, George Cholmondeley, Viscount
Members of the Privy Council of Great Britain
Whig (British political party) MPs for English constituencies
Malpas, George Cholmondeley, Viscount
George
3
Lords of the Admiralty